The Carnegie Art Award was a Swedish art award event established in 1998 by Swedish financial group Carnegie Investment Bank to recognize and promote Nordic contemporary painting and artists. With a total prize sum of SEK 2.1m, the Carnegie Art Award was one of the world’s largest art awards.

The event took place every second year from 2003 to 2014 and consisted of four parts: an exhibition on tour in all Nordic countries, a book and a film presenting the artists and their work, and the awards proper to the three winning artists. Further, one young artist was awarded a scholarship. 

In order to participate, artists had to be born or live in one of the Nordic countries. They could then be nominated by one of about 30 professionals in the field of contemporary art. A jury then selected the works to be included in the exhibition and the award winners.

Laureates

References

External links
Carnegie Art Award official website

Visual arts awards
Swedish awards
Awards established in 1998